Boris Yakovlevich Bazarov (1893 - 1939) was a Soviet secret police officer who served as the chief illegal rezident in New York City from 1935 until 1937.

Early life
Bazarov was born Boris Iakovlevich Shpak in 1893 in Kovno gubernia, Lithuania, which was then part of the Russian Empire. In addition to Russian, he spoke German, Bulgarian, French, and Serbo-Croatian.

Career
Bazarov graduated Vilno Military Academy and joined Russian Imperial Army 105th infantry regiment to take part in the First World War (1914, platoon leader, 1917 company leader). After the Russian Revolution as a man with military experience he volunteered for the Soviet secret police (OGPU). Since 1921 specialized on covert operations in Balkans (Bulgaria and Yugoslavia in 1924). In 1924-27 he was a Soviet representative in Austria (member of the Soviet embassy in Vienna) where he supervised Austrian, Bulgarian, Yugoslavian, and Romanian agents.

Since 1927 Bazarov returned to Moscow where he supervised the Balkan sector of OGPU intelligence. A year later he ran the OGPU "illegal resident" operations from Berlin which included France and Balkan line. His covert station controlled eleven agents in Paris, six in Bucharest, four in Sofia and Zagreb, and one for Belgrad and Istanbul. Since 1930 his network supervised the penetration of the Foreign Office (a code clerk, Ernest Holloway Oldham).

In 1935, Bazarov entered the United States illegally and stayed there till 1937. His agent team  there at the time included Iskhak Akhmerov, Norman Borodin, and Helen Lowry.

Death and legacy
Bazarov was suspected in the Great Purges and shot in 1939. He was posthumously rehabilitated in 1956.

References

Sources
Hede Massing, This Deception (New York, NY: Duell, Sloan and Pearce, 1951).
Allen Weinstein and Alexander Vassiliev, The Haunted Wood: Soviet Espionage in America—the Stalin Era. New York: Random House, 1999.
Nigel West and Oleg Tsarev, The Crown Jewels: The British Secrets at the Heart of the KGB Archives. London: HarperCollins, 1998; New Haven: Yale University Press, 1999).
 Bazarov on the official site of the Russian Intelligence Service
"Gorsky's List", at The Alger Hiss Story.

1893 births
1939 deaths
People from Kelmė
People from Rossiyensky Uyezd
KGB officers
Soviet spies
Great Purge victims from Russia
Russian people executed by the Soviet Union
Executed Russian people
Soviet rehabilitations